James Creaney (born 26 October 1964) was a Scottish footballer who played for Albion Rovers, Queen of the South, Stranraer and Dumbarton.

References

1964 births
Scottish footballers
Dumbarton F.C. players
Albion Rovers F.C. players
Queen of the South F.C. players
Stranraer F.C. players
Scottish Football League players
Living people
Association football forwards
Association football midfielders